Year 1400 (MCD) was a leap year starting on Thursday (link will display the full calendar) of the Julian calendar. The year 1400 was not a leap year in the Proleptic Gregorian calendar.

Events 
 January–December 
 Henry IV of England quells the Epiphany Rising and executes the Earls of Kent, Huntingdon and Salisbury, and the Baron le Despencer, for their attempt to have Richard II restored as king.
 February – Henry Percy (Hotspur) leads English incursions into Scotland.
 February 14 – The deposed Richard II of England dies by means unknown in Pontefract Castle. It is likely that King Henry IV ordered his death by starvation, to prevent further uprisings.
 March 23 – Five-year-old Trần Thiếu Đế is forced to abdicate as ruler of Đại Việt (modern-day Vietnam), in favour of his maternal grandfather and court official Hồ Quý Ly, ending the Trần dynasty after 175 years and starting the Hồ dynasty. Hồ Quý Ly subsequently changes the country's name to Đại Ngu.
 May – Frederick I, Duke of Brunswick-Lüneburg is declared as a rival to  Wenceslaus, King of the Romans. However, Frederick is murdered shortly after.
 August
 The English occupy Edinburgh in Scotland, but fail to capture Edinburgh Castle.
 The princes of the German states vote to depose Wenceslaus as King of the Romans, due to his weak leadership and mental illnesses.
 August 21 – Rupert, Count Palatine of the Rhine, is elected as King of the Romans.
 September 16 – Owain Glyndŵr is proclaimed Prince of Wales by his followers, and begins attacking English strongholds in northeast Wales.
 October/November – Sack of Aleppo (1400) during Timur's conquest of Syria.
 December – Manuel II Palaiologos becomes the only Byzantine Emperor ever to visit England.

 Date unknown 
 Timur defeats both the Ottoman Empire and the Mamluk Sultanate of Egypt, to capture the city of Damascus in present-day Syria. Much of the city's inhabitants are subsequently massacred by Timur's troops.
 Timur conquers the Empire of The Black Sheep Turkomans, in present-day Azerbaijan, and the Jalayirid dynasty in present-day Iraq. Black Sheep ruler Qara Yusuf and Jalayirid Sultan Ahmad flee, and take refuge with the Ottoman Sultan Bayezid I.
 In modern-day Korea, King Jeongjong of Joseon abdicates in fear of an attack by his ambitious younger brother, Taejong. Taejong succeeds to the throne.
 Prince Parameswara establishes the Malacca Sultanate, in present-day western Malaysia and northern Sumatra.
 Hananchi succeeds Min as King of Hokuzan, in modern-day north Okinawa, Japan.
 Wallachia (modern-day southern Romania) resists an invasion by the Ottomans.
 A Wallachian army captures Iuga, and makes Alexandru cel Bun the Prince of Moldavia.
 The Kingdom of Kongo begins.
  The Haast's eagle and Moa are both driven to extinction by Māori hunters.
 The Mississippian culture starts to decline.
 Europe is reported to have around 52 million inhabitants.
 The House of Medici becomes powerful in Florence.
 Newcastle upon Tyne is created a county corporate, by Henry IV of England.
 Jean Froissart completes his Chronicles, detailing the events of the 14th Century in France.

Births 
 January 13 – Infante John of Portugal, the Constable (d. 1442)
 March 15 – Guillaume Jouvenel des Ursins, Justice Minister of France (d. 1472)
 May 19 – John Stourton, 1st Baron Stourton, English baron (d. 1462)
 June 14 – Joan Ramon II, Count of Cardona (d. 1471)
 July 26 – Isabel le Despenser, Countess of Worcester, English noble (d. 1439)
 October 24 – Mani' ibn Rabi'a al-Muraydi, oldest known ancestor of the House of Al Sa'ud (d. 1463)
 December 25 – John Sutton, 1st Baron Dudley, Lord Lieutenant of Ireland (d. 1487)
 date unknown
 James Tuchet, 5th Baron Audley (d. 1459)
 Luca della Robbia, Florentine sculptor (d. 1482)
 Isabella, Duchess of Lorraine (d. 1453).
 Richard Neville, 5th Earl of Salisbury, English politician (d. 1460)
 Owen Tudor, Welsh courtier (d. 1461)
 Rogier van der Weyden, Dutch painter (or 1399)
 Hans Multscher, German painter and sculptor (d. 1467)
 Helene Kottanner, Hungarian writer and courtier (d. after 1470)
 probable
 Marina Nani, Venetian dogaressa (d. 1473)
 Giovanna Dandolo, Venetian dogaressa (d. after 1462)
 Johannes Gutenberg (d. 1468)

Deaths 

 January 7
 Thomas Holland, 1st Duke of Surrey, English politician (executed) (b. 1374)
 John Montagu, 3rd Earl of Salisbury, English earl (executed) (b. 1350)
 January 13 – Thomas le Despenser, 1st Earl of Gloucester, English politician (executed) (b. 1373)
 January 16 – John Holland, 1st Duke of Exeter, English politician (executed)
 February 14 – King Richard II of England, (probably murdered) (b. 1367)
 April 21 – John Wittlebury, English politician (b. 1333)
 April 23 – Aubrey de Vere, 10th Earl of Oxford, third son of John de Vere (b. 1338)
 April 28 – Baldus de Ubaldis, Italian jurist (b. 1327)
 June 5 – Frederick I, Duke of Brunswick-Lüneburg, rival King of the Romans
 June 17 – Jan of Jenštejn, Archbishop of Prague (b. 1348)
 October 25 – Geoffrey Chaucer, English poet (b. c. 1343)
 November 8 – Peter of Aragon, Aragonese infante (b. 1398)
 November 20 – Elizabeth of Moravia, Margravine of Meissen (b. 1355)
 November – Tarabya of Ava (b. 1368)
 December – Archibald the Grim, Scottish magnate (b. 1328)
 date unknown – Narayana Pandit, Indian mathematician (b. 1340)

References